Lanchester railway station served the village of Lanchester, County Durham, England from 1862 to 1965 on the Lanchester Valley Line.

History 
The station opened on 1 September 1862 by the North Eastern Railway. It was situated on the north side of Cadger Bank. The NER doubled the station's tracks in anticipation of the demand from collieries along with Knitsley, Bearpark, Malton and Langley. Like the rest of the stations on the line, this station closed to passengers on 1 May 1939. The station was occasionally used by Miners' Gala along with the rest of the stations on the line until 17 July 1954. The station closed to goods traffic on 5 July 1965.

References

External links 

Disused railway stations in County Durham
Former North Eastern Railway (UK) stations
Railway stations in Great Britain opened in 1862
Railway stations in Great Britain closed in 1939
1862 establishments in England
1965 disestablishments in England
Lanchester, County Durham